The Tiger Rail Trail or Birregurra-Forrest Rail Trail is a rail trail following the route of the former Forrest branch railway line.

External links
Rail Trails Australia trail description

Rail trails in Victoria (Australia)